Amanita subvaginata, also known as Australian false vaginata is a species of mycorrhizal fungus from the family Amanitaceae found in Sydney and New South Wales, Australia.

Description
Gill: They are very close to a stem and are white coloured, and with roughened edges.
It has a bulbous base that is slight. The species volva is located on the side of the bulb is marginate, and is of the same ashy-grey colour as the cap.
They are also subglobose and ellipsoid.

See also
List of Amanita species

References

subvaginata
Poisonous fungi
Fungi of Australia